DJA or Dja may refer to:
Daniel Jenkins Academy of Technology, a school in Haines City, Florida
DJA FM, a Chadian radio station
The Dja River, located in Cameroon
Dja Faunal Reserve, located near the Dja River in Cameroon
Dja, a sub-divided unit of the hekat, an ancient Egyptian volume unit
Dja Dja Wurrung people, an Aboriginal Australian people

Some people have Dja as part of their names:
Brice Dja Djédjé, a soccer player from Côte d'Ivoire
Franck Dja Djédjé, a soccer player from Côte d'Ivoire
Félix Dja Ettien, a soccer player from Côte d'Ivoire
Peggy Lam Pei Yu-dja, the CEO of the Family Planning Association of Hong Kong